The 1991 St Albans City and District Council election took place on 2 May 1991 to elect members of St Albans City and District Council in England. This was on the same day as other local elections.

Election result

Ward results

Ashley

Batchwood

Clarence

Cunningham

Harpenden East

Harpenden North

 
 

 

No Green candidate as previous (7.3%).

Harpenden South

Harpenden West

London Colney

Marshallwick North

Marshallwick South

Park Street

Redbourn

Sopwell

Sandridge

St. Peters

St. Stephens

 
 
 

 

No Independent candidate as previous (39.7%).

Verulam

Wheathampstead

References

1991 English local elections
1991
May 1991 events in the United Kingdom